This is a list of the members of the 15th Seanad Éireann, the upper house of the Oireachtas (legislature) of Ireland.  These Senators were elected or appointed in 1981, after the 1981 general election and served until the close of poll for the 16th Seanad in 1982.

Composition of the 15th Seanad 
There are a total of 60 seats in the Seanad. 43 Senators are elected by the Vocational panels, 6 elected by the Universities and 11 are nominated by the Taoiseach.

The following table shows the composition by party when the 15th Seanad first met on 8 October 1981.

List of senators

Changes

See also 
Members of the 22nd Dáil
Government of the 22nd Dáil

References

External links 

 
15